Journey into Self is a 1968 documentary film introduced by Stanley Kramer, produced and directed by Bill McGaw.

The film portrays a 16-hour group-therapy session for eight well-adjusted people who had never met before. The session was led by psychologists  Carl Rogers and Richard Farson. The participants included a cashier, a theology student, a teacher, a principal, a housewife, and three businessmen.

It won the Academy Award for Best Documentary Feature in 1968.

See also
List of American films of 1968

References

External links
 
 Journey into Self at the Center for the Study of the Person, founded by Carl Rogers link broken/removed

1968 films
1968 documentary films
American documentary films
Best Documentary Feature Academy Award winners
Black-and-white documentary films
Documentary films about psychology
American black-and-white films
1960s English-language films
1960s American films